Below follows a list of notable people from the metropolitan area of San Antonio, Texas.

Politics
 Glenn A. Abbey, U.S. diplomat
 Hope Andrade, Secretary of State of Texas, member of the Texas Transportation Commission 
 William P. Atkinson, Wisconsin State Assemblyman
 Claude W. Black, Jr., Baptist minister, civil rights leader, City Councilman and Mayor Pro Tempore
 Bill Blythe, state representative from Harris County; born in San Antonio, c. 1935
 Mario Cantu, Chicano activist
 Joaquin Castro, U.S. Representative from Texas's 35th congressional district since 2013; member of the Texas House; brother of San Antonio Mayor Julian Castro
 Henry E. Catto, Jr., Ambassador to the United Kingdom
 John Cornyn, U.S. Senator since 2002; attended Trinity University and St. Mary's University Law School in San Antonio
 Dwight D. Eisenhower, 34th President of the United States of America; stationed at Fort Sam Houston in 1916
 Rick Galindo, Republican member of the Texas House of Representatives from Bexar County; born in 1981 and reared in San Antonio
 Alberto Gonzales, U.S. Attorney General under President George W. Bush
 Henry B. Gonzalez, U.S. Representative for Texas's 20th congressional district, the Henry B. Gonzalez Convention Center in San Antonio is named in his honor
 John W. Goode, attorney and Republican politician; lost the 1961 special election for Congress to Henry B. Gonzalez
 Maria L. de Hernández (1896–1986), Mexican-American rights activist
 Barbara Hervey, Place 7 judge of the Texas Court of Criminal Appeals
 Rita Jenrette, wife of U.S. Congressman John W. Jenrette, Jr., of South Carolina, posed for Playboy magazine in 1981
 Lyndon B. Johnson, 36th President of the United States, retired to San Antonio
 Cyndi Taylor Krier, state senator and Bexar County administrative judge
 Lyle Larson, member of the Texas House of Representatives from District 122 since 2011; member of the Bexar County Commissioners Court and the San Antonio City Council
 Robert N. Lemen (1943-2021), Minnesota state legislator and businessman 
 Andre Marrou (born 1938), Libertarian Party member of the Alaska House of Representatives, 1988 nominee for Vice President of the United States, and 1992 nominee for President of the United States; brother of news anchor Chris Marrou
 Ruth McClendon (born 1943), Democrat member of the Texas House of Representatives from San Antonio since 1996; former member of the San Antonio City Council and Mayor Pro Tem, 1993–1996
 Tom Mechler, Texas Republican Party state chairman since 2015;  oil and gas consultant in Amarillo, former San Antonio resident
 Susan Pamerleau, retired United States Air Force major general and the Republican sheriff of Bexar County, first woman elected, 2012
 Brad Parscale, political strategist and founder of Giles–Parscale; Washington Post stated that he could "justifiably take credit" for Donald Trump's 2016 victory
 Joe Sage (1920–1977), member of the Texas House of Representatives from Bexar County, 1973–1975
 Mario Marcel Salas (born 1949), City Councilman District 2, Judson Independent School District Vice-President
 William S. Sessions (1930–2020), former FBI Director from 1987-1993; longtime attorney for the Russian Mafia's "Boss of Bosses" Semion Mogilevich
 Sally Shelton-Colby, Ambassador of the United States to Barbados, Grenada and Dominica; Minister to St Lucia; Special Representative to Antigua, St. Christopher-Nevis-Anguilla, and St. Vincent, 1979–1981, under Jimmy Carter
 John Thomas Steen, Jr., San Antonio lawyer and 108th Secretary of State of Texas
 G. J. Sutton, state representative, first black elected official in Texas
 Lou Nelle Sutton, wife of G. J. Sutton; succeeded him in the Texas House
 Percy Sutton, Manhattan borough president in New York City; civil rights attorney with such high-profile clients as Malcolm X; owner of the Apollo Theater in Harlem and several radio stations
 Jeff Wentworth, state senator from San Antonio; unseated in 2012 by Donna Campbell
 John H. Wood, Jr., federal judge in San Antonio until 1979, when he was assassinated by convicted murderer-for-hire Charles Harrelson, father of actor Woody Harrelson
 John C. Woods, executioner of the Nuremberg Trials; master sergeant in United States Army

Notable mayors
 Ron Nirenberg, 2017–Current
 Ivy Taylor, 2014–2017
 Julian Castro, 2009–2014, 16th U.S. Secretary of Housing and Urban Development under President Barack Obama
 Phil Hardberger, 2005–2009
 Howard Peak, 1997–2001
 Nelson Wolff, 1991–1995
 Henry Cisneros, 1981–1989, Secretary of HUD under President of the United States Bill Clinton
 Lila Cockrell, 1976–1981, 1989–1991
 Maury Maverick, Sr., 1939–1941
 Juan Seguin, 1841–1842
 Sam Maverick, 1839–1840

Artists
 Bryan Willis Hamilton, music producer
 Carl Hoppe
 Julian Onderdonk, landscape painter
 Porfirio Salinas
 Todd White, former lead character designer for SpongeBob SquarePants (John Marshall High School)
 Verner Moore White
 Pendleton Ward, creator of cartoon  Adventure Time

Architects
 O'Neil Ford (1905–1982), nationally renowned architect; only individual ever to be declared a national landmark (1974)
 Alfred Giles (1853–1920), designed many historic homes and courthouses, including the Pershing House
 Robert H.H. Hugman, (1902–1980), civil engineer; saved San Antonio after 1921 floods; designed River Walk (1922–38); astute urban planner, indefatigable prophet of civic rebirth
 David Lake, founding partner of Lake|Flato architects

Astronauts
 David Scott, NASA astronaut who flew on Gemini 8, Apollo 9, and, as commander of the Apollo 15 Moon mission, became the seventh man to walk on the Moon.
 Ed White, NASA astronaut who flew on Gemini 4, when he became the first American spacewalker, and was set to fly on Apollo 1, but died in an accident during a plugs-out test.

Film and television
 Poni Adams, actress
 Kevin Alejandro, actor (Lucifer)
 Jesse Borrego, actor (Blood In Blood Out)
 Taylor Ball, actor (Still Standing)
 Gil Birmingham, Comanche actor (Twilight film series)
 Dustin Lance Black, screenwriter (Milk)
 Pat Boyette, KENS-TV news anchor, comic book artist, actor, composer, film director
 Lara Flynn Boyle, actress (Twin Peaks), married San Antonio businessman Donald Ray Thomas in 2006
 Paul Briggs, Animator (Big Hero 6: The Series, Zootopia , and Frozen)
 Carol Burnett, Emmy Award-winning actress and comedian
 Wendell Burton, actor (The Sterile Cuckoo)
 Cass Ole (d. 1993), Arabian stallion from films The Black Stallion and The Black Stallion Returns; buried at his owner's home in San Antonio
 Elizabeth Chambers, TV personality, founder of BIRD Bakery
 Ricardo Antonio Chavira, actor (Desperate Housewives)
 Jessica Collins, actress (Heroes)
 Joan Crawford (1904–1977), Academy Award-winning film actress (Mildred Pierce)
 Madison Davenport, actress (Sharp Objects, From Dusk till Dawn: The Series)
 Dayna Devon, TV presenter
 Jade Esteban Estrada, actor, comedian
 Jake Flores, comedian
 Al Freeman, Jr., Emmy Award-nominated actor (One Life to Live)
 Thomas Gibson, actor (Dharma & Greg, Criminal Minds)
 Summer Glau, actress (Firefly)
 Nicholas Gonzalez, actor (Resurrection)
 Pedro Gonzalez-Gonzalez, actor (Rio Bravo)
 Jackie Earle Haley, Academy Award-nominated actor (Little Children)
 Armie Hammer, actor (Call Me by Your Name)
 Jim Hill, sportscaster
 Ann Harding, actress
 Stephen Herek, director
 Daisy and Violet Hilton, British-born conjoined twins (Freaks)
 iDubbbz, YouTuber
 Tommy Lee Jones, Academy Award-winning actor; his ex-wife Kimberlea Moser is the daughter of San Antonio's former mayor, Phil Hardberger
 Jonathan Joss, actor (King of the Hill)
 Callie Khouri, Academy Award-winning screenwriter (Thelma and Louise)
 Katie Leclerc, actress (Switched at Birth)
 Jim Lehrer, anchor of PBS NewsHour
 Hal LeSueur, actor; brother of Joan Crawford
 Chris Marrou, TV personality and news anchor at KENS
 Bruce McGill, actor (MacGyver, National Lampoon's Animal House)
 Ashley Austin Morris, actress (The New Electric Company)
 Marcia Nasatir, film producer and executive
 Pola Negri, silent-film actress
 John Allen Nelson, actor (24)
 Derek Lee Nixon, actor ([[When in Rome (2002 film)|When in Rome]]) 
 Oliver North, Fox News commentator and presenter, Marine colonel who assisted opponents of Nicaragua's Sandinista government 
 Norah O'Donnell, CBS News correspondent
 Jared Padalecki, actor (Gilmore Girls, Supernatural)
 Fred Parker Jr., actor (The Best Man, I Saw the Light)
 Scott Pelley, broadcast journalist and author
 Grace Phipps, actress (Fright Night (2011), The Nine Lives of Chloe King (2011), The Vampire Diaries (2012), Teen Beach Movie (2013), and Teen Beach 2 (2015))
 Ann Prentiss, actress, died in prison
 Paula Prentiss, actress (The Stepford Wives, What's New, Pussycat?), wife of actor-director Richard Benjamin and sister of Ann Prentiss
 John Quiñones (born 1952), TV journalist and presenter
 Sendhil Ramamurthy, actor (Heroes)
 Kevin Reynolds, film director and screenwriter (Robin Hood: Prince of Thieves)
 Emilio Rivera, actor (Lie to Me)
 James Roday, actor (Psych)
 Michelle Rodriguez, actress (Lost)
 Robert Rodríguez, film director (Spy Kids)
 Jayne Walton Rosen, entertainer with Lawrence Welk
 Karen Sharpe, actress and wife of producer-director Stanley Kramer
 Ginny Sims, singer with Kay Kyser orchestra from 1938 to 1942
 Kim Spradlin, television personality; winner of Survivor: One World Andy Stahl (born 1952), actor
 Henry Thomas, actor (Gangs of New York, E.T. the Extra-Terrestrial)
 Kathy Vara, TV journalist 
 Pendleton Ward, creator of Adventure Time, Bravest Warriors and The Midnight Gospel Peter Weller, actor (RoboCop, Star Trek Into Darkness)

Scientists and academics
 Michael Brame, professor of linguistics
 Elsa Salazar Cade, educator, entomologist
 Robert Cade, medical doctor and inventor of Gatorade
 William H. Cade, insect behaviorist, cricket expert
 Daniel Dumitru, physiatrist and electromyographer; born in San Antonio
 Thomas Callister Hales, mathematician ; born in San Antonio
 Maria Hernandez Ferrier, former president of Texas A&M University–San Antonio; former advisor to the United States Secretary of Education on bilingual education
 William Esco Moerner, Nobel Prize winner in Chemistry
 Marie Charlotte Schaefer, physician
 Cynthia Teniente-Matson, president of Texas A&M University–San Antonio
 Forrest Mims, American amateur scientist, educator, engineer, author

Athletics
Baseball
 Gary Bell, 12-year MLB pitcher; four-time All-Star, one World Series appearance

 Randy Choate, MLB relief pitcher
 Alva Jo Fischer, All-American Girls Professional Baseball League player inducted into the San Antonio Sports Hall of Fame and the Texas Baseball Hall of Fame
 Cito Gaston,12-year MLB outfielder; one All-Star game; managed Toronto Blue Jays for 12 seasons, including consecutive World Series championships (1992–93); first African-American manager to win WS title; elected to Canada's BB HOF (2002)
 Jerry Grote, MLB, New York Mets World Series catcher and two-time All-Star catcher
 Bob Heise, MLB player for the Mets, Giants, Brewers, Cardinals, Angels, Red Sox and Royals
 Joe Horlen, MLB All-Star pitcher for Chicago White Sox and Oakland A's
 Cliff Johnson, MLB catcher
 Davey Johnson,is an American former professional baseball player and manager. Best remembered as the Manager of the 1986 World Series Champion New York Mets
 Brandon Larson, MLB player for the St. Louis Cardinals
 Boone Logan (born in Helotes), MLB pitcher for the Yankees, White Sox and Braves
 Jeff Manship, MLB player for the Minnesota Twins
 Frank Snyder, MLB World Series champion Catcher for New York Giants.
 Ross Youngs, native of Shiner, TX but grew up in San Antonio; played for NY Giants under legendary manager John McGraw; ten seasons (1917–26), two World Series titles (1921–22), .322 lifetime BA; died 1927, age 30; elected to BB HOF, 1972; only San Antonian enshrined at Cooperstown

Basketball

 Devin Brown, shooting guard, graduated from South San Antonio West Campus High School and UTSA
 Jordan Clarkson, guard, currently plays for the Utah Jazz, graduated from Karen Wagner High School
 Fennis Dembo, forward, played for the NBA world champion Detroit Pistons in 1989 and graduated from Fox Tech High School
 Keith Edmonson, forward, played for several NBA teams in 1982–83 and graduated from Douglas MacArthur High School
 Jeff Foster, center, Indiana Pacers, since 1999 and who graduated from James Madison High School
 Askia Jones, guard, played for the Minnesota Timberwolves, graduated from John Marshall High School
 Wesley Matthews, guard for the Portland Trail Blazers, Utah Jazz, Dallas Mavericks, Indiana Pacers, and currently the Milwaukee Bucks
 Shaquille O'Neal, center, Basketball Hall of Famer, graduated from Robert G. Cole High School, Fort Sam Houston, after leading his team to a 36–0 record and state championship; four-time NBA champion with the Los Angeles Lakers and the Miami Heat
 Ike Ofoegbu (born 1984), American-Nigerian Israeli Premier Basketball League player
 Bo Outlaw, forward, played for several NBA teams between 1994 and 2006, graduated from John Jay High School
 Trent Plaisted, forward, drafted 46th overall in the 2008 NBA Draft, plays overseas for K.K. Zadar in Croatia; graduated from Tom Clark High School
 André Roberson, guard/forward, plays for the Oklahoma City Thunder, graduated from Karen Wagner High School
 Ben Uzoh, guard for the Cleveland Cavaliers and New Jersey Nets; graduated from Earl Warren High School in 2006

Boxing
 Robert Quiroga (1969–2004), IBF super flyweight champion, 1990–93

Football

 Anthony Alabi (Antonian)
 Jace Amaro (MacArthur)
 Scott Ankrom (John Jay High School)
 Patrick Bailey (Alamo Heights High School)
 Glenn Blackwood (Churchill)
 Lyle Blackwood (Churchill)
 Chris Bordano (Southwest)
 Quincy Butler (Roosevelt)
 Cody Carlson (Churchill)
 Keith Cash (Oliver Wendell Holmes High School)
 Kerry Cash (Holmes)
 Bruce Collie (Robert E. Lee) 
 Tony Darden (Holmes) 
 Trey Darilek (Robert E. Lee) 
 Quintin Demps (Roosevelt) 
 Ty Detmer (Southwest) 
 Ronald Flemons (John Marshall High School) 
 Erik Flowers (Roosevelt) 
 Philip Gaines (Judson) 
 Darryl Grant (Highlands) 
 Derwin Gray (Judson) 
 Gary Green (Sam Houston) 
 Cedric Griffin (Holmes) 
 David Hill (Highlands) 
 Carlyle Holiday (Roosevelt) 
 Priest Holmes (John Marshall High School) 
 Moton Hopkins (Randolph High School)
 Rob Housler (Judson)
 Weldon Humble (Brackenridge) 
 Sam Hurd (Brackenridge) 
 A.J. Johnson (Clemens) 
 Randy Johnson (Sam Houston)
 N.D. Kalu (John Marshall High School) 
 Wade Key (Edison) 
 Clint Killough (MacArthur)
 Trevor Knight (Reagan)
 Tommy Kramer (Robert E. Lee) 
 Keith Lee
 Travis Lewis (Robert E. Lee) 
 Wane McGarity (Tom C. Clark High School) 
 Warren McVea (Brackenridge) 
 Primo Miller (Brackenridge)
 Willie Mitchell (Brackenridge) 
 Sammy Morris (Jay) 
 Kellen Mond (Reagan)
 Tommy Nobis (Jefferson)
 Joe Pawelek (Smithson Valley) 
 Robert Quiroga (Holmes) 
 Gabriel Rivera (Jefferson)
 Reggie Rivers (Randolph) 
 Corey Robinson (San Antonio Christian)
 Aaron Ross (Fox Tech) 
 Kyle Rote (Jefferson) 
 Tobin Rote (Harlandale) 
 Corey Sears (Judson) 
 Andrew Sendejo (Smithson Valley) 
 Scott Solomon (John Marshall High School)
 Jim Strong (Sam Houston High School), San Francisco 49ers, New Orleans Saints, Florida Blazers, San Antonio Wings
 Ty Summers (Reagan)
 Jim Bob Taylor (Somerset)
 Mykkele Thompson (John Paul Stevens High School)
 Michael Toudouze (East Central) 
 Alex Van Pelt (Churchill)

Professional bodybuilding
 Heather Armbrust
 Vickie Gates

Professional wrestling
 Tully Blanchard
 Shoichi Funaki
 Jose Lothario
 Shawn Michaels
 Dusty Wolfe
 Thunder Rosa
 Lance Cade

Shooting
 Keith Sanderson (born 1975), sport shooter

Swimming
 Josh Davis (Churchill High School), Olympic gold medalist
 Jimmy Feigen (Churchill High School), Olympic gold medalist

Tennis
 Wilmer Allison, member of International Tennis Hall of Fame

Track & field
 Jennifer Gutierrez (Holmes), Olympic triathlete
 Anjanette Kirkland (Holmes), World Championships gold medalist in 100-meter hurdles
 Darold Williamson (Oliver Wendell Holmes High School), Olympic gold medalist in 4x400-meter relay

 Rodeo 
 Gene Lyda, professional bull rider from Somerset, Texas; National High School Rodeo Association champion bull rider; member of Professional Rodeo Cowboys Association; Top 15 Bull Riders at 1967 National Finals Rodeo in Oklahoma City, Oklahoma; current partner/manager of La Escalera Ranch; son of San Antonio general contractor and rancher Gerald Lyda

Music industry
 Moe Bandy, country singer from San Antonio area, Lone Oak, Texas; brother of professional bull rider Mike Bandy; recorded "Bandy the Rodeo Clown" and other hits for Columbia Records; regularly performs in Branson, Missouri
 Aaron Barker, country singer-songwriter
 Ally Brooke, singer and member of girl group Fifth Harmony
 Johnny Bush, country singer, performed with Ray Price's Cherokee Cowboys and Willie Nelson's Record Men band, wrote and had a smash RCA Victor single with "Whiskey River", lives in San Antonio, wrote autobiography Whiskey River, Take My Mind Vikki Carr, pop and Latin singer, recorded for Liberty Records, provided background vocals for Bob Wills during his Liberty Records sessions; lives in San Antonio
 Bill Cody, host for WSM-AM morning show in Nashville; country music radio personality from 1987 to 1994 in San Antonio at KKYX-AM, host of Great American Country's Classic country Weekend With Bill Cody and Great American Country's Master Series Christopher Cross, Oscar Award-winning singer/songwriter and four-time Grammy Award winner
 Al Dean, country singer and bandleader of The All-Stars, recorded hugely popular "National Anthem of Texas", "Cotton-Eyed Joe", which is played at San Antonio Spurs basketball games
 Jessy Dixon, gospel music singer born in San Antonio, regular on Gaither Homecoming video series
 Holly Dunn, country singer-songwriter, radio personality
 Steve Earle, progressive country singer/songwriter, married to singer Allison Moorer, sister of singer Shelby Lynne
 Alejandro Escovedo, punk rock, roots rock, alternative country singer/songwriter, from a family that boasts several professional musicians
 Rosita Fernández, Tejano and conjunto musician
 Robert Fitzpatrick, actor, entertainment lawyer who managed such acts as Bee Gees, The Who, The Rolling Stones, Cream, Mitch Ryder & the Detroit Wheels, The Buckinghams, Dick Dale & the Del-Tones, Dobie Gray, Taj Majal and Peggy Lee
 Rosie Flores, rockabilly and country music artist; toured with Wanda Jackson and Asleep at the Wheel
 Pat Green, singer-songwriter of Texas music
 Gibby Haynes, founding member and lead singer of the Butthole Surfers, a popular rock band formed at Trinity University
 Tish Hinojosa, Tejano singer, recorded for A&M Records and Watermelon Records
 Adolph Hofner, country singer, toured Texas festivals, fairs and rodeos with his band The Pearl Wranglers, had daily radio program on KMAC radio, sponsored by Pearl Beer, recorded for Okeh Records
 Bobby Jarzombek, drummer for bands such as Halford, Sebastian Bach and Spastic Ink; brother of Ron Jarzombek
 Ron Jarzombek, guitarist for bands such as S.A. Slayer (San Antonio Slayer), Watchtower, Spastic Ink and Blotted Science; brother of Bobby Jarzombek
 Flaco Jiménez, Tejano and conjunto musician, accordionist, member of Texas Tornados
 Paul Leary, a founding member and guitarist of the Butthole Surfers, a popular rock band formed at Trinity University
 Austin Mahone, soloist singer
 Marshall Dyllon, country vocal group consisting of brothers Paul Martin and Michael Martin, Todd Sansom, Jess Littleton and Daniel Cahoon, charted three Top 50 Billboard country songs, "Live It Up" (2000), "You" (2001) and "She Ain't Gonna Cry" (2000)
 Phillip Martin III (also known as ‘Nino’, ‘Pony J’ and ‘Jake’), rapper, producer and distributor 
 Jordan McCoy, American Juniors runner-up, signed with Sean (Puffy) Combs
 Lydia Mendoza, Tejano and conjunto musician, first garnered fame in San Antonio
 Augie Meyers, Tex-Mex, country and rock musician, member of The Texas Tornados, founding member of the Sir Douglas Quintet, charted Top 100 Billboard solo country hit "Kap Pa So" (1988) on Atlantic-American Records, session keyboardist for Bob Dylan's Grammy-winning album of the year Time Out of Mind (1998) and its follow-up, Love and Theft (2001)
 Michael Morales, Grammy Award-winning pop artist who had two Billboard top-40 hits in the early 1990s; graduated from San Antonio's Oliver Wendell Holmes High School
 Mina Myoui, singer, main dancer of South Korean pop group Twice; born in San Antonio and lived in Houston for a little bit before moving to Japan when she was younger
 Emilio Navaira, Grammy Award-winning Tejano music and country music singer
 Michael Nesmith, singer-songwriter, member of The Monkees and co-star of their NBC-TV musical-comedy series; producer of award-winning video "Elephant Parts"; early member of band Denny Ezba and the Goldens along with Keith Allison ("Where the Action Is"; Paul McCartney lookalike bass player in Paul Revere & the Raiders), Augie Meyers and Wayne Hensley
 Offbeats, San Antonio-based garage/punk band
 Zulema Garcia Olsen, musician and composer
 Sunny Ozuna, singer for Sunny & the Sunglows
 Chris Pérez, Tejano Latin rock guitarist, married Tejano singer Selena
 Jay Perez, Tejano
 Ray Peterson, 1960s pop singer whose major hits included "Corrine, Corrina", "Missing You", "The Wonder of You" and "Tell Laura I Love Her" for RCA Victor Records
 Randy Piper, heavy metal guitarist best known for his work with W.A.S.P., 1982–1986
 Red River Dave McEnery, hillbilly singer/songwriter, film, radio and recording star; in the early 1940s, returned to San Antonio and broadcast his songs on XERF radio located along Texas/Mexico border; appeared in several B-Western films, including 1944's Swing in the Saddle Elida Reyna, Tejano, lead singer of Latin Grammy Award-winning band Elida Y Avante
 Emily Robison, plays banjo, dobro, guitar and vocals in Grammy Award-winning country music group the Dixie Chicks
 Robert Xavier Rodriguez, classical composer
 Mike Ryan, country music singer-songwriter
 Doug Sahm, Tex-Mex, country and rock musician, member of Texas Tornados, leader of Sir Douglas Quintet, known for "She's About a Mover" and "Mendocino"
 Olga Samaroff, concert pianist and first wife of conductor Leopold Stokowski
 John Schneider, actor and singer, best known as Bo Duke on CBS TV series The Dukes of Hazzard, had 18 Top 100 Billboard hits on the country chart, appeared as Curley in television film Stagecoach starring Willie Nelson and Waylon Jennings; San Antonio resident
 George Strait, Grammy Award-winning country music superstar, has more than 60 No. 1 hits including The Chair and "All My Ex's Live in Texas"; starred in Universal Pictures film Pure Country, lives in San Antonio
 Kevin Talley, heavy metal drummer with bands such as Dying Fetus, Chimaira and Daath
 Megan Thee Stallion rapper, singer-songwriter, and actress born in San Antonio and raised in Houston.
 Ernest Tubb, singer-songwriter, inducted into Country Music Hall of Fame, member of Grand Ole Opry, lived in San Antonio in the 1940s
 Justin Tubb, singer-songwriter, member of Grand Ole Opry, son of country music legend Ernest Tubb, born in San Antonio
 Upon a Burning Body, deathcore band
 Patricia Vonne, singer, actress, sister of Robert Rodriguez
 Worldwide (Michael Parker), rapper, emcee and producer

Writers
 Jacques Barzun, leading cultural historian
 Sandra Cisneros, author, lives in a purple house in the city's King William District
 Dan Cook, San Antonio sportswriter for more than 50 years
 Ron Franscell, true-crime author and journalist
 Marcus Goodrich, screenwriter and novelist
 Heloise, syndicated advice columnist, lives in suburb of Helotes
 Esther Hicks, San Antonio-based best-selling author and inspirational speaker, Law of Attraction, Ask & It Is Given, The Astonishing Power of Emotions Dolores Hitchens, mystery novelist
 Char Miller, local historian and environmentalist
 Barbara Ras, San Antonio writer and publisher, The Last Skin, Bite Every Sorrow, One Hidden Self, and Costa Rica: A Traveler's Literary Companion Rick Riordan, San Antonio-based novelist, Big Red Tequila, The Last King of Texas, Southtown, Mission Road, Percy Jackson & the Olympians, The Kane Chronicles, The Heroes of Olympus, The Maze of Bones, Vespers Rising Shea Serrano, author, The Rap Year Book, Basketball (and Other Things) Lynn Schooler, photographer and author of The Blue Bear and Walking Home Naomi Shihab Nye, writer and poet
 Whitley Strieber, writer and film producer, Communion, The Hunger and Wolfen''
 Light Townsend Cummins, historian and author
 Rudy Ruiz, award-winning author, advocate, and social entrepreneur

Religion
 James T. Draper, Jr., president of the Southern Baptist Convention, 1982–1984; pastor in San Antonio in the early 1960s
 Patrick Flores (born 1929), retired Catholic Archbishop of San Antonio (archbishop 1979–2004)
 José Horacio Gómez, Catholic Archbishop of San Antonio
 John Hagee, televangelist and pastor of Cornerstone Church
 Cardinal William H. Keeler, born in San Antonio; Archbishop of Baltimore
 Max Lucado, best-selling Christian author and pastor of the city's Oak Hills Church
 Samuel M. Stahl, Rabbi Emeritus of Temple Beth-El (San Antonio, Texas)

Billionaires
 Charles Butt, H-E-B
 Rodney Lewis, oil and natural gas industrialist, worth $2.8 billion
 Lowry Mays, Clear Channel Communications
 B. J. (Red) McCombs, founding partner in Clear Channel, auto dealer, and former owner of the San Antonio Spurs, Minnesota Vikings, and Denver Nuggets

Civic leaders
 Tom Benson, owner of New Orleans Saints and automobile dealer
 Ferdinand Ludwig Herff, medical pioneer
 Anna Goodman Hertzberg, founder of Tuesday Musical Club in 1901
 William Greehey, founder of Valero Energy, NuStar Energy, and the Greehey Family Foundation
 Peter Holt, chairman of Spurs, partner in Caterpillar, Inc.
 Herb Kelleher, chairman of Southwest Airlines
 Robert F. McDermott, chairman emeritus of USAA
 Henry R. Muñoz III, businessman and political activist
 Emma Tenayuca, heroic labor leader, union organizer, and educator; led the 1938 pecan workers strike.
 Ed Whitacre, retired CEO of SBC/AT&T

Businesspeople
 Sardar Biglari, CEO of Biglari Holdings
 Josef Centeno, chef, restaurateur, and cookbook author
 Marisol Deluna, fashion designer
 Lorenzo Gomez III, entrepreneur and author
 Johnny Hernandez, chef, caterer and restaurateur
 Gerald Lyda, founder and president of Lyda Inc. and Lyda Constructors, Inc.; owner of  La Escalera Ranch in Texas; former owner of Ladder Ranch in Sierra County, New Mexico
 John T. Montford, businessman in San Antonio since 2001; chancellor of Texas Tech University System, state senator and district attorney from Lubbock
 Sarah Newcomb Merrick, teacher, principal, writer, businessperson, homeopath
 Jeff Smisek, President and CEO of United Airlines; graduate of Roosevelt High School
 Ross Richie, CEO and Founder of comic book and graphic novel publisher Boom! Studios

Other
 Rodney Alcala, serial killer; born in San Antonio
 Anderson Lee Aldrich, mass-murderer; born in San Antonio
 Joe Ball, murderer and possible serial killer; born in San Antonio
 José María Jesús Carbajal, military officer in the Mexican–American War; born in San Fernando de Béxar, present-day San Antonio
 Mitch Clem, cartoonist and writer, lives outside San Antonio, in Kirby
 Casper H. Conrad Jr., U.S. Army brigadier general
 Mariana W. de Coronel, collector
 Davy Crockett, frontiersman; fought in the Battle of the Alamo
 Ivan Edwards (physician), a prior ordained Minister, a Physiatrist, USAF Reserve Flight surgeon (Lt Col), started a Child sponsorship for orphans in Uganda, community organizer.
 King Fisher, rancher and gunfighter from Eagle Pass, was murdered in the Vaudeville Theater Ambush in 1884
 Joseph Gottschalk, "Thong Man"
 Ernest Hinds, US Army major general
 Herman F. Kramer, U.S. Army major general
 Vivian Liberto, former wife of country music legend Johnny Cash; mother of Rosanne Cash
 Walter L. McCreary, U.S. Army Air Corps/U.S. Air Force officer, former prisoner of war (POW), and combat fighter pilot with the Tuskegee Airmen
 Deaf Smith, frontiersman noted for his part in the Texas Revolution and the Army of the Republic of Texas, died In Richmond, Texas in 1837

References 

 
San Antonio
San Antonio, Texas
People